The  is the unofficial name for a railway branch line in Yuzawa, Niigata, Japan, operated by East Japan Railway Company (JR East).

The standard gauge line is a short (1.8 km) branch line that extends from Echigo-Yuzawa Station on the Jōetsu Shinkansen to Gala-Yuzawa Station, but is officially classified as a branch of the (narrow gauge) Jōetsu Line. The line has no intermediate stations.

Gala-Yuzawa Station serves the nearby ski resort Gala Yuzawa (ski lifts operate directly from the station), so the station is only used during the winter period. During the skiing season, Tanigawa services from Tokyo are extended to run to Gala-Yuzawa. All trains on the line are classified as "limited express", so a limited express surcharge is required.

The branchline was originally built for maintenance purposes, but was upgraded for passenger service from 20 December 1990 when JR East developed the ski resort. Outside the winter season, the line is used for switching trains terminating at and departing from Echigo-Yuzawa Station.

See also
 Hakata-Minami Line, another Shinkansen-style non-Shinkansen line

References

Jōetsu Shinkansen
Lines of East Japan Railway Company
Rail transport in Niigata Prefecture
Standard gauge railways in Japan
Railway lines opened in 1990
1990 establishments in Japan